Dindymus is Old World genus of true bugs in the family Pyrrhocoridae. They are often confused with bugs in the family Lygaeidae, but can be distinguished by the lack of ocelli on the head.

Species

BioLib lists:
subgenus Cornidindymus Stehlík, 2005 
 Dindymus abdominalis Distant, 1914
 Dindymus griseus Stehlík, 2006
 Dindymus straeleni Schouteden, 1933
subgenus Dindymus Stål, 1861

 Dindymus albicornis (Fabricius, 1803)
 Dindymus albomarginatus Stehlík, 2007
 Dindymus brevis Blöte, 1931
 Dindymus chinensis Stehlík & Jindra, 2006
 Dindymus croesus Distant, 1914
 Dindymus decisus Walker, 1873
 Dindymus decolor Breddin, 1900
 Dindymus flavipennis Blöte, 1931
 Dindymus lanius Stål, 1863
 Dindymus medogensis S.L. Liu, 1981
 Dindymus punctithorax Stehlík, 2006
 Dindymus pyrochrous (Boisduval, 1835)
 Dindymus rubiginosus (Fabricius, 1787)
 Dindymus sanguineus (Fabricius, 1794)

subgenus Limadindymus Stehlík, 2005

 Dindymus brunneus (Stehlík, 2005)
 Dindymus dispersus Stehlík, 2006
 Dindymus kotheae (Stehlík, 2005)
 Dindymus montanellus (Stehlík, 2005)
 Dindymus riedeli (Stehlík, 2005)
 Dindymus schoenitzeri (Stehlík, 2005)

subgenus Pseudodindymus Stehlík, 2009
 Dindymus sandakan Stehlík, 2010
incertae sedis

 Dindymus amboinensis (Fabricius, 1803)
 Dindymus basifer Walker, 1873
 Dindymus bifurcatus Stehlík & Jindra, 2006
 Dindymus bougainvillensis Stehlík, 2006
 Dindymus circumcinctus Stål, 1863
 Dindymus constanti Stehlík & Jindra, 2006
 Dindymus dembickyi Stehlík, 2006
 Dindymus fecialis Stål, 1863
 Dindymus flammeolus (Distant, 1901)
 Dindymus kokadanus Stehlík, 2006
 Dindymus lautereri Stehlík, 2006
 Dindymus malayensis Stehlík, 2006
 Dindymus minutus Blöte, 1933
 Dindymus nitidicollis Stehlík, 2006
 Dindymus pectoralis Schmidt, 1932
 Dindymus pulcher Stal, 1863
 Dindymus rubriventris Stehlík, 2006
 Dindymus talaudensis Stehlík & Jindra, 2006
 Dindymus thunbergi Stål, 1856.
 Dindymus ventralis Mayr, 1866
 Dindymus versicolor (Herrich-Schaeffer, 1853)
 Dindymus webbi Stehlík, 2006
 Dindymus wynigerae Stehlík & Jindra, 2006

Several species in the genus are beneficial predators, including D. rubiginosus, D. pulcher. and D. pyrochrous, but one species (D. versicolor) is a minor plant pest.

References 

Pyrrhocoridae
Pentatomomorpha genera
Hemiptera of Africa
Hemiptera of Asia